Joel Hastings Metcalf (January 4, 1866 – February 23, 1925) was an American astronomer, humanitarian and minister.

Reverend Metcalf graduated from Harvard Divinity School in 1892. He served as a Unitarian minister in Burlington, Vermont and in Taunton, Massachusetts, Winchester, Massachusetts and Portland, Maine.

He discovered or co-discovered several comets, including 23P/Brorsen-Metcalf and 97P/Metcalf-Brewington, and also 41 asteroids during 1905–1914, as credited by the Minor Planet Center.

Two of his discoveries, the main-belt asteroids 726 Joëlla and 792 Metcalfia, were named in his honor.

Bibliography

See also

References

External links 
 Joel Hastings Metcalf – Minister, Humanitarian, Astronomer
 Joel H. Metcalf "home page"
 Metcalf, Joel Hastings (1866-1925)

1866 births
1925 deaths
American astronomers
Discoverers of asteroids
Discoverers of comets
Harvard Divinity School alumni
People from Burlington, Vermont
People from Taunton, Massachusetts